The Omani Royal Guard Military Band is the official music band of the Royal Guard of Oman and the seniormost military band of the Sultan of Oman's Armed Forces. It is specifically dedicated to providing ceremonial honours and music to the Sultan of Oman, the House of Al Said, and public officials.

Activities 
The following protocols events are the basis for the activities of the Band of the Royal Guard of Oman:

 Being present at military parades and national events 
 Honoring foreign heads of state during state visits to Muscat 
 Support the ceremonial activities of the RGO and the Sultan 
 Performing exhibition drill

The band frequently performs at home and abroad. Domestically, the band annually performs at a military tattoo in the Royal Opera House Muscat. As per the band's international presence, members of the band have performed in Egypt, the United Kingdom, France, the UAE, and Russia. The mounted band has at one point, performed for Queen Elizabeth II at Windsor Castle in London. The Steel Band also has had an opportunity to participate in the Steel Band Festival in Australia, while the Pipes and Drums have competed in three international pipes and drums competitions in Scotland. In June 2019, it had the honor to perform on Horse Guards Parade for the British Army's Beating Retreat.

Organization 

 Headquarters Administration Company
 Central Infantry Band
 Royal Cavalry Mounted band
 Pipes and Drums
 Jazz Band 
 Steel Band
 Symphonic Orchestra
 School of Music

Headquarters Administration Company
The Headquarters Administration Company is the main support band, which provides logistical, instructional, and administrative assistance to the band.

Central Infantry Band
The Infantry Band is the premier unit in the RGO Band. The band performs as a concert band, as well as a marching band. The band is divided into two sections which make up the band's composition.

Royal Cavalry Mounted Band
The Royal Cavalry Mounted Band is the world's only camel mounted pipe band.  The horses that are employed are mainly a mix of Arabs, Clydesdales and Shires. The mounted band, which is composed of at least 100 horses and riders, is based at the Al Safinat stables in the Royal Palace. Since 2001, it has seen a significant number of women in its ranks, with women accounting for 25% of the riders in the band as of 2018. When on parade, the pipers lead while a large carriage pulled by six horses carrying kettle drummers follows behind. As a result of the pipes leaving gaps in the pipers teeth, Sultan Qaboos bin Said al Said in 2008, requested that a company design some specialized pipe tubes for the band.

School of Music
The RGO School of Music is responsible for training musicians of the RGO in all aspects, including marching and the performance of marching music.

Ceremonial Music

See also
Sultan of Oman's Armed Forces
Royal Guard of Oman
Military band
Mounted band
Pipe band
Corps of drums
Fanfare band
Marching bands

References 

Military of Oman
Military bands
Omani monarchy